Ålbæk (alternative spelling: Aalbæk) is a small coastal town in Frederikshavn Municipality, Region Nordjylland, Denmark, with a population of 1,437 (1 January 2022).

Ålbæk is served by Aalbæk station, located on the Skagen railway line.

Notable people 
 Ingeborg Buhl (1880 in Ålbæk – 1963) a Danish fencer, competed the 1924 Summer Olympics

References

External links

Cities and towns in the North Jutland Region
Frederikshavn Municipality